Canning Bridge railway station is a railway station on the Transperth network. It is located on the Mandurah line, four kilometres from Perth station inside the median strip of the Kwinana Freeway located adjacent to the suburb of Como.

History

The station was originally constructed as the Canning Bridge bus station, with bus platforms at the Kwinana Freeway and Canning Highway levels, enabling transfer between bus services on those two roads. The bus station opened on 11 February 2002, and cost $34 million.

The contract for the construction of Canning Bridge railway station, along with Bull Creek railway station and Murdoch railway station, was awarded to John Holland Pty Ltd in November 2004. This contract was the first contract awarded for the construction of stations on the Southern Suburbs Railway project, and it had a value of $32 million. Construction on the conversion to a railway station began in early 2006.

The lower bus platforms closed on 29 January 2006 for the construction of the Mandurah railway line and conversion to railway platforms.

To make room for the rail corridor, the 120-metre-long, 1,800-tonne Canning Highway bus bridge was moved 9.5 metres southwest by pulling the bridge sideways over Teflon mats. This was a more economical alternative to constructing a completely new bridge. The move did not disrupt ongoing traffic on the Kwinana Freeway.

The station opened along with the rest of the Mandurah line on 23 December 2007.

Services
Canning Bridge station is served by Transperth Mandurah line services.

Canning Bridge station saw 932,132 passengers in the 2013–14 financial year.

Platforms

Bus routes

References

General references and further reading

External links

Station map New MetroRail

Como, Western Australia
Mandurah line
Railway stations in Perth, Western Australia
Railway stations in Australia opened in 2007
Bus stations in Perth, Western Australia
Transperth railway stations in highway medians